Peter Hänsel (born 29 November 1770 in Leppe, Silesia Province; d. 18 September 1831 in Vienna) was a German-Austrian violinist and classical composer of almost exclusively chamber music. He has been recently viewed not only as the principal representative of the true quartet school of Joseph Haydn and Wolfgang Amadeus Mozart, but also the composer responsible for incorporating French and Polish influences into the Viennese classical style, thus serving as mediator between Germany, France and Poland.

Like his contemporary Ludwig van Beethoven (1770–1827), he was one of Haydn's composition pupils during the 1790s. He died in Vienna shortly before his 61st birthday.

Life and works
After a musical apprenticeship with his uncle in 1787 in Warsaw, Hänsel traveled to Russia and joined the orchestra of Prince Grigory Alexandrovich Potemkin in St. Petersburg, which at the time was under the direction of master Giuseppe Sarti. In 1788 he returned to Warsaw after the completion of his contract. In the spring of 1791 he was concert master at the court of Princess Izabela Lubomirska in Vienna, where he was employed from 1796 with a fixed annual salary. Hänsel took lessons with Joseph Haydn in 1802, maintaining a relatively conservative compositional style throughout his career. After learning as much as he could from Haydn he then traveled to Paris where he lived from 1802 to 1803, later returning to Vienna.
 
He created a comprehensive volume of 58 string quartets, 6 string trios, 4 quintets, 3 quartets with flute and clarinet, 9 violin duets, also Variations, Polonaises, Rondos, Marches and numerous other musical pieces for keyboard and strings.

See also
Classical music
Romantic music

References

Attribution
This article is based on a translation of the corresponding article of the German Wikipedia. A list of contributors can be found there at the History section.

Literature
Constantin von Wurzbach: Hänsel, Peter. In: Biographisches Lexikon des Kaiserthums Oesterreich. Vol. 7, Publisher Zamarski LC, Vienna 1856-1891, p. 182

External links

1770 births
1831 deaths
String quartet composers
18th-century Austrian musicians
18th-century Austrian male musicians
18th-century classical composers
18th-century German composers
19th-century Austrian musicians
19th-century Austrian male musicians
19th-century classical composers
19th-century classical violinists
19th-century German composers
19th-century German male musicians
Austrian classical violinists
Austrian male classical composers
Austrian people of Prussian descent
Austrian Romantic composers
German classical violinists
German male classical composers
German Romantic composers
Male classical violinists
People from Silesia
Pupils of Joseph Haydn
String quartet composers